Miahuaxihuitl of Cuauhnahuac was a Queen of Tenochtitlan. Her name is also spelled as Miyahuaxihuitl. She was mother of the Princess Matlalcihuatzin and the Aztec Emperor Moctezuma I. She was also an aunt of the Queen Chichimecacihuatzin I and sister of the king Cuauhtototzin.

Biography 

Miahuaxihuitl was born a princess, daughter of Tezcacohuatzin, king of Cuauhnahuac. She was known to be very beautiful.

Miahuaxihuitl became a wife of Aztec Emperor Huitzilihuitl. She was greeted with a pomp when she came to Tenochtitlan. She bore a son who would later become Emperor Moctezuma I.

Moctezuma married Miahuaxihuitl's niece Chichimecacihuatzin.

Family tree

See also
List of Tenochtitlan rulers
Cacamacihuatl

References

External links

Tenochca nobility
Queens of Tenochtitlan
Aztec nobility